In queueing theory, Bartlett's theorem gives the distribution of the number of customers in a given part of a system at a fixed time.

Theorem
Suppose that customers arrive according to a non-stationary Poisson process with rate A(t), and that subsequently they move independently  around a system of nodes. Write E for some particular part of the system and p(s,t) the probability that a customer who arrives at time s is in E at time t. Then the number of customers in E at time t has a Poisson distribution with mean

References

Probability theorems
Queueing theory